The Queen Mother is a 1916 British silent adventure film directed by Wilfred Noy and starring Owen Roughwood, Gladys Mason and Barbara Rutland.

Cast
 Owen Roughwood as The Duke 
 Gladys Mason as Princess of Saxonia  
 Barbara Rutland as Duchess Miramar  
 Sydney Lewis Ransome as Prince Ludwig  
 Ronald Hammond as Osric  
 M. Mills as King of Montavia

References

Bibliography
 Low, Rachael. History of the British Film, 1914-1918. Routledge, 2005.

External links

1916 films
1916 adventure films
British adventure films
Films directed by Wilfred Noy
British silent feature films
British black-and-white films
1910s English-language films
1910s British films
Silent adventure films